Griekspoor is a surname. Notable people with the surname include: 

Scott Griekspoor (born 1991), Dutch tennis player
Tallon Griekspoor (born 1996), Dutch tennis player